Mamadou Diallo (born 2 July 1990) is a Guinean former professional footballer who played as a striker.

Career
When Diallo was seven years old, he was inspired to become a footballer after his brother became a professional footballer in the local league.

He signed a contract with Hougang United FC in 2008. He was able to secure a contract and a work permit to ply his trade in Singapore without any issues. The peak of his career in Singapore football was after a season with Hougang United which won him the Yeo's people choice award for 2013 S league season.

For season 2014, Hougang United FC was ready to offer a contract renewal but he was denied a work permit by the Singapore Ministry of Manpower.
Upon hearing this, some Hougang United fans started a petition in 2014 as a last effort to dissuade the Ministry from denying the permit; however, his work permit was denied anyway.

References

1990 births
Living people
Guinean footballers
Association football forwards
Hougang United FC players
Singapore Premier League players
Guinean expatriates in Singapore
Expatriate footballers in Singapore